Antiochus VI Dionysus (c. 148–142/1 BC), king of the Hellenistic Seleucid kingdom, was the son of Alexander Balas and Cleopatra Thea, daughter of Ptolemy VI of Egypt.

Biography
Antiochus VI did not actually rule.  Either already in 145 or in early 144 BC he was nominated by the general Diodotus Tryphon as heir to the throne in opposition to Demetrius II, and remained the general's tool.  In c. 142/141 BC, the young king died. While some ancient authors make Diodotus Tryphon responsible for the death of the king, others write that he died during a surgery.

See also

 List of Syrian monarchs
 Timeline of Syrian history

References

Footnotes

External links 

Antiochus VI entry in historical sourcebook by Mahlon H. Smith

140s BC births
140s BC deaths

Year of birth uncertain
Year of death uncertain
2nd-century BC Seleucid rulers
Antiochus 06
Monarchs deposed as children
Ancient child monarchs
2nd-century BC rulers
Antiochus 06